The Australian women's national junior handball team is the national under-19/21 Handball team of Australia. Controlled by the Australian Handball Federation it represents Australia in international matches.

In December 2015 they played in the Singapore SHOT tournament playing four games but losing all of them. They also played three games in the New South Wales Women's League to gain valuable game time together. This is all preparation for the Oceania title in 2016.

History

World Championship record

Oceania Nations Cup record

References

External links
Official website
 Profile on International Handball Federation webpage
 Oceania Continent Handball Federation webpage

Women's national junior handball teams
Junior national team
Handball - Junior women's